Romani studies (occasionally Gypsiology) is an interdisciplinary ethnic studies field concerned with the culture, history and political experiences of the Romani people. The discipline also focuses on the interactions between other peoples and Romas, and their mindset towards the Romas.

Other terms for the academic field include Ziganology, Ciganology, Romology, Romalogy, and Romistics.

Some of the notable scholars of Romani studies includes Colin Clark and Lev Cherenkov among others.

Publications
Some of the dedicated publications on Romani studies are:
Critical Romani Studies (Central European University, Hungary)
Romani Studies (Gypsy Lore Society, United States)
Romani studies back catalogue of the University of Hertfordshire Press.
Romani tagged articles at Harvard University.

See also
Names of the Romani people

References

External links 
Romani Project at the University of Manchester
List of Romani studies publications from University of Hertfordshire Press
The 2011 Inaugural Conference in Romani Studies, University of California, Berkeley

 
Ethnic studies
Romani advocacy